Arthur William Way (March 5, 1879 – February 21, 1964) was a California politician.

Way was born in Eureka, California. From 1925 to 1929 he served as Mayor of Eureka. A park was named after him. He also served as state assembly member from January 3, 1949, until he resigned on November 18, 1949. Way ran for the 3rd Senate district after Michael J. Burns died in office and won in a special election unopposed.

Way died on February 21, 1964, in his hospital bed from a stroke.

References

1879 births
1964 deaths
Republican Party members of the California State Assembly
Republican Party California state senators
People from Eureka, California